James Wharton may refer to:

 James Wharton, Baron Wharton of Yarm (born 1984), British politician
 James Wharton (author) (born 1987), author and LGBT activist
 James Wharton (boxer) (1813–1856), English boxer
 James Wharton (cricketer) (born 2001), English cricketer
 James Edward Wharton (1894–1944), United States Army officer
 J. Ernest Wharton (1899–1990), U.S. Representative from New York